

League tables
A total of 47 teams contest the division, which is divided into three tables west, center and east, including 41 sides remaining in the division from last season, three relegated from the Algerian Championnat National 2, and three promoted from the Regional League I (4th Division).

Center Group

Eastern Group

Western Group

References

Inter-Régions Division seasons
3
Algeria